Evropa 2 is a private, commercial radio station in the Czech Republic. It was the first private station since 1989, beginning broadcasting on 21 March 1990.

The station's target audience is listeners aged 12–29 years. It is owned by Czech Media Invest (owner of Czech News Center), who purchased the station from the French Lagardère Active in 2018.

One of its shows was Dance Extravaganza.

References

External links 
 Evropa 2 - official website (in Czech)

Radio stations in the Czech Republic
Lagardère Active
Radio stations established in 1990